Pueribacillus  is a  Gram-positive, spore-forming, rod-shaped, aerobic and motile genus of bacteria from the family of Bacillaceae with one known species (Pueribacillus theae). Pueribacillus theae has been isolated from Pu'er tea.

References

Bacillaceae
Bacteria genera
Monotypic bacteria genera
Bacteria described in 2018